The Ouachita Baptist Tigers are composed of 16 teams representing Ouachita Baptist University in intercollegiate athletics, including men and women's basketball, golf, soccer, swimming, and tennis. Men's sports include baseball, football, and wrestling. Women's sports include volleyball, cross country, and softball. The Tigers compete in the NCAA Division II and are members of the Great American Conference. The wrestling team competes as a single-sport member of the Great Lakes Valley Conference. The men's and women's swimming teams compete in the New South Intercollegiate Swim Conference.

Teams

Baseball
Ouachita Baptist has had 5 Major League Baseball Draft selections since the draft began in 1965.

Basketball
Ouachita Baptist has had one NBA draft selection.

Football

References

External links